Danupha Khanatheerakul (born 13 November 2002), better known by her stage name, Milli, is a Thai rapper and singer. She rose to prominence nationally with her debut single "Phak Kon" (พักก่อน), which was released in February 2020. It was followed by another successful single "Sud Pang" (สุดปัง) later that year. In April 2022, she performed at the Coachella Valley Music and Arts Festival, becoming the first Thai solo artist to perform there.

In 2022, Danupha appeared on BBC's 100 Women list as one of the world's inspiring and influential women of the year.

Early and personal life
Milli was born Danupha Khanatheerakul on 13 November 2002 in Bangkok, Thailand. She has had an interest in hip-hop since when she was in Matthayom 2 (equivalent to Grade 8) and has cited Nicki Minaj as her inspiration.

On 21 July 2021, the military government of Prayut Chan-o-cha charged her for criticizing its poor response to the COVID-19 pandemic. She was accused of posting information which "threatens the national security", a crime punishable by up to five years in prison. Thai netizens, including multiple artists and music entities, voiced out their support of her using the hashtag "#Saveมิลลิ" (#SaveMilli). The government additionally vowed to prosecute at least 20 more Thai influencers for criticizing the government, accusing them of spreading "fake news".

2019–present: Music career

Milli began her career on stage by competing on the Thai TV show The Rapper 2. She was praised by the contest's judges for her exotic acting and singing style. She is registered as an artist under YUPP!, a Thai rapping-centred label.

Debut singles
Milli recorded her first single "Phak Khon" (พักก่อน) in February 2020, a sarcastic hip-hop fused song about her friends in school and a message of anti-bullying. This song uses Lu, Isan and English. It launched her into popularity, with the music video reaching 90,226,674 views on YouTube as of April 2022.

In June 2020, she recorded a second single "Sud Pang" (สุดปัง), that is about her life, dreams and beauty. This song uses Thai (Northern and Southern), Isan, Japanese, phasa lu, and English. This song has 43,308,512 views on YouTube as of April 2022.

Coachella Festival 2022 

Milli performed with artists from 88rising at the Coachella Valley Music and Arts Festival on 17 April 2022, making her the first Thai solo artist to perform there. Her performance included a rapping that mentioned "trains from Rama V's reign – in use for 120 years"; referring to the outdated trains still used regularly in modern Thai Railway, and "hundred-thousand-baht Kinnari light poles"; referring to the notorious corruption case of Racha Thewa subdistrict government spending state funds on the Kinnari-topped light poles, costing THB 100,000 each and THB 68.2 millions in total. She finished her show eating a dish of Thai dessert mango sticky rice on the stage, leading to a surge in consumption of the dish in Thailand, with orders for mango sticky rice doubling in some stores. A mango sticky rice store in Bangkok reported that an additional  of sticky rice had to be prepared following the unprecedented surge for the dish.

Around the same time, the Thai film  in which she made a cameo has been released in cinemas. She coincidentally mentioned her dream of becoming an internationally recognised artist as part of her dialogue in the film. This prompts the film's director Nawapol Thamrongrattanarit to post on Facebook congratulating her, saying "the film and reality have now crossed and co-exist at the same time".

Discography

Studio album

Singles

OSTs

As a leading or featured artist

Other works

Lyrics/rap/melody 

 ร้าย (FIERCE) – หวาย
 MiNi HEART (มินิฮาร์ท) – Miya Thongchua
 Booty Bomb – 4EVE

Television 

 The Graduates บัณฑิตเจ็บใหม่ (2021)

Film 

 , directed by Nawapol Thamrongrattanarit (2022)

Awards

References

2002 births
Living people
People from Bangkok
Thai rappers
21st-century Thai women singers
Thai child singers
Victims of cyberbullying
Isan-language singers
Japanese-language singers
English-language singers from Thailand
BBC 100 Women